Hertzberger is a surname. Notable people with the surname include:

Eddie Hertzberger (1904–1993), Dutch industrialist
Herman Hertzberger (born 1932), Dutch architect
Jeroen Hertzberger (born 1986), Dutch field hockey player

See also
Herzberger